Desmoxytes planata, is a species of millipedes in the family Paradoxosomatidae. It is a pantropical species with a vast distribution due to human interference in transportation. It is native to Andaman Islands and introduced to Thailand, the Seychelles, Java, Sri Lanka, Fiji and probably in Malay Peninsula.

Live specimens are pink colored.

References

Desmoxytes
Animals described in 1895